Janny Rivera (born 16 August 1988) is a Colombian professional footballer who plays for Atlanta Silverbacks as a midfielder.

Career
Born in Colombia, Rivera was an NSCAA All American at Louisburg College (NC) and played his junior year at University of South Carolina before joining Clayton State.

Rivera also spent 2012 with the Atlanta Silverbacks Reserves before he signed a contract with the pro club Atlanta Silverbacks in March 2014.

Janny made his professional debut on April 19, 2014 at home against the San Antonio Scorpions. The Silverbacks lost the game 2-1 and Rivera was cautioned with a yellow card.

References

External links

1988 births
Living people
Clayton State University alumni
Colombian footballers
Colombian expatriate footballers
South Carolina Gamecocks men's soccer players
Atlanta Silverbacks players
Association football midfielders
Expatriate soccer players in the United States
North American Soccer League players